The 2019 election of members to the Senate of the Philippines was the 33rd election of members to the Senate of the Philippines for a six-year term. It was held on May 13, 2019.

The seats of 12 senators elected in 2013 were contested during this election, and the senators that were elected in this election would serve up to June 30, 2025. The winners in this election joined the winners of the 2016 election to form the 18th Congress of the Philippines. The senators elected in 2016 would serve until June 30, 2022.

The Partido Demokratiko Pilipino-Lakas ng Bayan (PDP–Laban), the ruling party headed by President Rodrigo Duterte, led its own administration coalition, the Hugpong ng Pagbabago.

The Senate election was held concurrently with elections to the House of Representatives and local officials above the barangay level.

Hugpong ng Pagbabago won overwhelmingly, while the main opposition coalition, Otso Diretso, was not able to win any seat in the Senate. Hugpong won 9 seats, while the Nationalist People's Coalition, United Nationalist Alliance, and an independent candidate won 1 seat each.

A total of five women, or 42% of the seats contested, won the election, beating the previous record of four female winners set in 2013 (12 seats contested) and in 1992 (24 seats contested).

Electoral system

Senate elections in the Philippines are conducted via the plurality-at-large voting system, where the entire country is one at-large "district". Each voter can select up to twelve candidates (one vote per candidate), and the twelve candidates with the highest total number of votes are elected.

Senators are term-limited to two consecutive terms, although they are eligible for a third non-consecutive term. Only half of the seats are up in every senatorial election. The winning senators succeeded those elected in 2013, and joined those elected in 2016 in the 18th Congress.

Each party endorses a slate of candidates, typically not exceeding a 12-person ticket. A party may also choose to invite "guest candidates" to complete its slate. The party may even include, with the candidates' consent, independent candidates and candidates from other parties as the party's guest candidates. Parties also may form coalitions to endorse a multi-party slate of candidates.

While the Philippines is a multi-party system, parties tend to group themselves into two major coalitions in midterm elections (e.g. Lakas-Laban vs NPC in 1995; PPC vs Puwersa ng Masa in 2001). This is opposed to senatorial elections in presidential election years where most presidential candidates also have senatorial slates. This results in an election where voters can choose between two major political forces. Sometimes a weaker third coalition is also formed.

Winning candidates are proclaimed by the Commission on Elections (COMELEC), sitting as the National Board of Canvassers. Candidates are proclaimed senators-elect if the thirteenth-place candidate no longer has a mathematical chance of surpassing the twelfth-place candidate. Post-proclamation disputes are handled by the Senate Electoral Tribunal, a body composed of six senators and three justices from the Supreme Court.

Coalitions

2016 election
As the 2016 Senate election was held concurrently with the presidential election, most of the presidential candidates also put up their respective senatorial slates. These slates shared several candidates, although most of the shared candidates only campaigned with one slate. The presidential election was won by Davao City Mayor Rodrigo Duterte of the Partido Demokratiko Pilipino-Lakas ng Bayan (PDP–Laban), while the vice presidency was won by the Liberal Party's Leni Robredo, the representative from Camarines Sur. Senator Bongbong Marcos disputed Robredo's victory, and his electoral protest was pending before the Presidential Electoral Tribunal at that time.

Koko Pimentel, Duterte's party-mate, was elected as president of the Senate in July 2016 by a large majority, while a handful of Liberal Party senators comprised the minority; they were later joined by other Liberal Party members who had earlier voted for Pimentel, forming a six-person minority bloc in the Senate.

Pimentel resigned from the Senate presidency on May 21, 2018. He was replaced by Tito Sotto of the Nationalist People's Coalition (NPC), who was elected by majority of the senators.

Coalition for Change / Tapang at Malasakit Alliance 

In October 2017, the Partido Demokratiko Pilipino-Lakas ng Bayan (PDP–Laban) was only considering to form a coalition with the Nacionalista Party for the 2019 senatorial elections.

In November 2017, PDP–Laban reportedly released a "partial list" of their senatorial slate for the 2019 edition consisting of six people. The party's president Koko Pimentel clarified that the list was not finalized and remarked that there was "no party decision yet". In January 2018, the House Speaker announced that the 6 candidates were now official. In February 2018, two more names were added to PDP–Laban's potential slate.

Pimentel announced a shortlist of 20 names in April 2018. It included himself and the five other senators that were members of the majority bloc, several administration officials, representatives, and private citizens. Pimentel said that his list was not approved by Alvarez when he released it.

By August 2018, Pimentel wrote to Duterte of their party's prospective candidates for the Senate. Pimentel divided the names into three groups: members of PDP–Laban, outsiders, and the incumbent senators of the majority bloc. Pimentel said that Duterte's decision would be final in the composition of their slate.

Otso Diretso 

In March 2018, a supposed Liberal Party slate was circulated on social media. The list of candidates included Interior Secretary Mar Roxas, Sen. Bam Aquino, former senators Teofisto Guingona III and Ramon Magsaysay Jr., former Pampanga governor Eddie Panlilio, former representative from Quezon Lorenzo Tañada III, representative from Albay Edcel Lagman, representative from Northern Samar Raul Daza, Magdalo Representative Gary Alejano, Representatives Jose Christopher Belmonte from Quezon City and Kaka Bag-ao from Dinagat Islands, and Cebu City Mayor Tomas Osmeña. However, on April 2, Magsaysay said that he had no plans of returning to the Senate. Lagman, Daza, and Belmonte all denied that they were running for senator. Alejano, meanwhile, neither confirmed nor denied his plans. After multiple candidates denied interest in running, Senator Francis Pangilinan denied that this slate was an accurate list of Liberal Party candidates, as the official list had yet to be finalized.

In April, Antonio Trillanes said that his Samahang Magdalo was cooperating with the Liberal Party, Akbayan and Tindig Pilipinas to put up an opposition coalition against the pro-Duterte parties. On April 24, Liberal Party and other groups urged Mar Roxas to run. By mid-May, the Liberal Party had settled on several names; however, Roxas himself declined to run. The Liberals intend to form a coalition with anti-Duterte groups, with the slate being named as "the Resistance". In June, Alejano announced his intention to run.

Leni Robredo announced that she accepted the role of opposition leader in the election, and they released the line-up by mid-September. The line up may include former Chief Justice Maria Lourdes Sereno, who was removed from office by a quo warranto petition. By August, Roxas, in an interview at Robredo's radio show said that he was unsure of his plans in 2019. In early September, a list of 18 possible candidates was publicized by the coalition. The list included incumbent senator Paolo Benigno "Bam" Aquino IV, Magdalo representative Gary Alejano, former Department of Interior and Local Government secretary Manuel "Mar" Roxas II, former chief justice Maria Lourdes Sereno, former Quezon representative Lorenzo "Erin" Tañada III, lawyer Jose Manuel "Chel" Diokno, former Bangsamoro Transition Committee member Samira Gutoc, former Solicitor General Florin Hilbay, former Akbayan representative Ibarra "Barry" Gutierrez III, actor Dingdong Dantes, former presidential spokesman Edwin Lacierda, writer Manuel Luis "Manolo" Quezon III, activist Leah Navarro, actress Agot Isidro, musician Jim Paredes, election lawyer Romulo Macalintal, former Social Welfare secretary Corazon "Dinky" Soliman, and ex-chief justice Hilario Davide Jr.

By October 2018, before the 2019 general elections, the Liberal Party formed the Otso Diretso, an electoral coalition led by the party that also comprises members of the Magdalo Party-List, Akbayan Citizens Action Party, and Akyson Demokratiko along with independent candidates. The coalition hopes to drive a new political culture based on political leaders practicing "makiking, matuto, kumilos" (listen, learn, take action), each candidate emphasizing the need for government to listen to its citizens. As part of the Liberal Party's efforts to instill this new political culture, it launched Project Makining in October 2018, a modern, nationwide listening campaign driven by volunteers. It aimed to find out what have been important to Filipinos, the basis for the messaging, strategy, and platform of the coalition.

Nationalist People's Coalition 

By June 2017, Nationalist People's Coalition (NPC), erstwhile chairman emeritus Danding Cojuangco returned as chairman, in an active leadership role. Senate Majority Leader Tito Sotto said Cojuangco was reportedly unsatisfied with how the party was being run, as leadership cannot agree on what direction to take.

The party has considered all of the eligible incumbents from the majority bloc to run in its slate as "Friends of the party". Sotto also said that Bam Aquino, the only non-term limited incumbent from the minority bloc, was also invited to run in their slate. Aquino is the nephew of NPC founder Cojuangco who Sotto said would personally help Aquino in the latter's campaign. Sotto announced in July 2018 that Senator JV Ejercito and former senator Lito Lapid would run under the NPC banner. Ejercito said this was to avoid his running together with his half-brother Jinggoy Estrada, under the Pwersa ng Masang Pilipino. Lapid was formerly from the-then moribund Lakas–CMD.

Hugpong ng Pagbabago, Nacionalista, and other alliances

Hugpong ng Pagbabago, Davao City mayor Sara Duterte's regional political party in the Davao Region formed in mid-2018, reportedly had national parties it wanted to forge alliances with. By August, the Hugpong had established alliances with the Nacionalista Party, Nationalist People's Coalition, the National Unity Party, and six other local parties. In August, incumbent senator Cynthia Villar announced that she would seek reelection. The coalition also supported the candidacies of Governor Imee Marcos and Representative Pia Cayetano.

Partido Federal ng Pilipinas 
A new political party called the Partido Federal ng Pilipinas (Federal Party of the Philippines) was launched and accredited by the Commission on Election on October 8, 2018. It elected Land Bank of the Philippines director Jesus Hinlo as president. On October 17, 2018, the party nominated three senatorial candidates for the 2019 midterm elections, namely Maria Socorro Manahan, Elmer Francisco, and Diosdado Padilla.

Katipunan ng Kamalayang Kayumanggi
A new political party, led by Consultative Committee on Constitutional Amendments member Ding Generoso fielded nine candidates in this mid-term election.

Term-limited and retiring incumbents
The following were barred from running since they were on their second consecutive six-year term:

Francis Escudero (Independent)
By April 2018, Escudero was undecided on his plans. He noted that he was enticed to be a private citizen after his term ends. He ultimately filed his candidacy to run for governor of Sorsogon under the NPC. He eventually won. Escudero ran for senator in 2022 and won.
Gregorio Honasan (UNA)
Honasan was tagged to be most likely to be named as Secretary of Information and Communications Technology in December 2017. Honasan dismissed the report as a "mere rumor". Honasan was eventually appointed as Secretary Information and Communications Technology a day after his senatorial term expired. Honasan ran for senator in 2022 and lost.
Loren Legarda (NPC)
Legarda was silent on plans after finishing her term, but was rumored to be nominated by President Duterte as Secretary of Social Welfare and Development. Legarda noted that the Department of Social Welfare and Development "is a very important department that should take care of the poorest and the most vulnerable population." Legarda ultimately filed her candidacy to be representative from Antique. She was facing disqualification as a case was filed by former Representative Exequiel Javier alleging she did not establish a six-month residency in the province. Later, the Election Registration Board of Pandan approved her transfer of registration. Legarda eventually won. Legarda ran for senator in 2022 and won.
Antonio Trillanes (Nacionalista)
Trillanes did not run for any position in 2019, and would instead focus on teaching and being the chairman of the Samahang Magdalo. Trillanes ran for senator in 2022 and lost.
It was disputed if Koko Pimentel (PDP–Laban) had already been on his second term, considering he only took over from Juan Miguel Zubiri's seat after the latter resigned and Pimentel won his electoral protest against him.

Mid-term vacancies 
Alan Peter Cayetano, who was on his second consecutive term, resigned from the Senate in order to become Secretary of Foreign Affairs on May 18, 2017. It left one vacant seat and since it was vacated less than three years before Cayetano's term would have expired, no special election was held to fill the seat. Cayetano resigned as foreign affairs secretary on October 17, 2018 and filed his candidacy as House representative from Pateros and Taguig's 1st district. Cayetano eventually won the election, and was later elected House Speaker. Cayetano ran for senator in 2022 and won.

Candidates 

Half of the seats in the Senate, or the 12 seats disputed in odd-numbered years since 1995, were up in the 2019 senatorial election.

Administration coalition

Opposition coalitions

Others

Opinion polling

Opinion polling, locally known as "surveys" in the Philippines, is conducted by Social Weather Stations (SWS), Pulse Asia and other pollsters. The first poll released through by the DZRH website reportedly done by SWS in December 2017 was not posted in SWS's official website, and SWS neither confirmed nor denied the existence of the survey when asked by the Philippine Star, leading to speculation that it was commissioned by a third party.

Survey details

Per candidate
This list includes all individuals named by at least 10% of respondents in any of the nine conducted surveys. The top 16 candidates with the highest favourability in each poll are listed below, where the top 12 is marked with a "black line". For a comprehensive list of all individuals included in the surveys, see the main article.

Per party
 Parties (excluding independents) with the plurality of seats in boldface.
 Parties (excluding independents) with the majority of seats are shaded by the party color.

Seats won
 Totals may not add up to 12 due to margin of error.

Seats after the election
Totals may not add up to 24 due to margin of error.
Notes:
Incumbent Senator Ralph Recto was denoted as a Liberal Party member up to September 21, 2018, after which he became a Nacionalista Party member.
Incumbent Senator JV Ejercito was denoted as a PMP member up to October 10, 2018, after which he became an NPC member.

Per coalition

Debates 
On February 28, 2019, Otso Diretso candidates Gary Alejano, Samira Gutoc, Florin Hilbay, and Romulo Macalintal wrote a letter to the Commission on Elections (COMELEC), requesting to facilitate a debate with administration-supported party Hugpong ng Pagbabago. Otso Diretso said that the debate "would benefit not only the senatorial aspirants, but mainly the voting public." Davao City Mayor Sara Duterte slammed the former for being "fixated" on debates. Prior to this, on February 25, the day of the 33rd anniversary of People Power Revolution, Otso Diretso had challenged the Hugpong ng Pagbabago candidates for public debate but none of them showed up in the event. On March 8, the COMELEC rejected the request of debate by Otso Diretso.

Debates independently organized outside of COMELEC were still done. GMA Network had their debate on February. On February and March, ABS-CBN organized series of debates entitled "Harapan". CNN Philippines held a debate in the University of Santo Tomas (site of their leg of the 2016 vice presidential debate) which was attended by 11 candidates on April.

Issues
In February, Cebu representative Gwendolyn Garcia was dismissed by the Ombudsman for a corruption case and barred her from seeking public positions from 2019 onward, but Garcia said that she would appeal the dismissal at the courts.

Candidates campaigning from detention were previously allowed; Senator Antonio Trillanes ran and won in 2007 despite being jailed for taking part in the Oakwood mutiny. Trillanes was ultimately convicted of participating in a coup d'etat after winning, but accepted the amnesty passed by Congress that was proposed by President Benigno Aquino III. While convicts are not allowed to run anymore unless pardoned or accepting an amnesty, these people had pending cases as of yet and were innocent until proven guilty.

As this was a midterm election, it served as a de facto referendum on the policies of the presidency of Rodrigo Duterte, such as pursuing the Philippine Drug War, bringing back the death penalty, federalism in the Philippines, and the Bangsamoro peace process, among other things.

Constitutional change
One of President Rodrigo Duterte's promises during the 2016 election campaign was to revise the current constitution and to shift the country from a unitary form to a federal form. On September 29, 2017, PDP–Laban presented a draft constitution to Congress.

The House of Representatives, through Speaker Pantaleon Alvarez began its own hearings on constitutional change without the participation of the Senate. Alvarez took a hard line on the interpretation that voting via the Constituent Assembly would be joint, instead of the two chambers voting separately, as is the usual. A joint vote would've rendered the Senate's votes as virtually meaningless, as the representatives outnumbered them by almost 300–23. Senators maintained that voting must be done separately. Senator Grace Poe moved that all moves to make the Senate irrelevant in the proposed constitution be rejected by the Senate, and supported Panfilo Lacson's suggestion that any vote be separate.

Results

This is how the Senate has been currently constituted. On July 25, 2016, voting 20–3, senators elected Koko Pimentel as the new Senate President. The senators who voted for Pimentel became the majority bloc. Senator Francis Escudero then nominated Senator Ralph Recto, a member of the Liberal Party, for the presidency. Senator Antonio Trillanes seconded Escudero's nomination. During nominal voting, Pimentel voted for Recto. Recto voted for Pimentel. After losing the vote, Recto automatically became the Minority Leader. He was joined by Escudero and Trillanes. Drilon was later elected Senate President Pro-Tempore while Sotto was elected Majority Leader.

On February 27, 2017, Senator Manny Pacquiao, a key administration ally, moved to remove from key positions LP senators Franklin Drilon, Francis Pangilinan and Bam Aquino and opposition-allied Risa Hontiveros (Akbayan). Drilon was removed as Senate President Pro-Tempore, Pangilinan was relieved as agriculture committee chairman, and Aquino was sacked as education committee chairman. Hontiveros was also removed as health committee head. The revamp prompted the LP senators to shift to the minority bloc. De Lima later joined them. Senator Ralph Recto, who used to be the Senate Minority Leader, was elected to replace Drilon as Senate President Pro-Tempore.

Key:
 ‡ Seats up
 + Gained by a party from another party
 √ Held by the incumbent
 * Held by the same party with a new senator

Per candidate
Winning candidates were proclaimed on May 22. Nine candidates in the Hugpong ng Pagbabago slate won. None of the Otso Diretso candidates won, while three won who were not from either slate.

Five incumbents won reelection: Cynthia Villar, Grace Poe, Sonny Angara, Koko Pimentel and Nancy Binay.

Four neophytes won election: Bong Go, Ronald dela Rosa, Imee Marcos and Francis Tolentino. Go and dela Rosa won their first elections.

Three former senators were elected back to the Senate: Pia Cayetano, Lito Lapid and Bong Revilla.

Four former senators, Jinggoy Estrada, Mar Roxas, Serge Osmeña, and Juan Ponce Enrile, lost in their bids to reenter the Senate.

Incumbents JV Ejercito and Bam Aquino did not successfully defend their seats.

Per coalition
The seats won totals does not account for guest candidates.

Per party

See also
Controversial media portrayals of senatorial candidates before the start of campaign period (February 12, 2019):
Bato (The General Ronald dela Rosa Story) – a film about Ronald "Bato" dela Rosa
"Steak" – an episode of Maalaala Mo Kaya about Christopher "Bong" Go
"Tatlong Henerasyon ng Sipag at Tiyaga" – an episode of Magpakailanman about the family of Cynthia Villar

Notes

References

 Project Makinig Official Website
 Otso Diretso Official Website

2019
Senate
May 2019 events in the Philippines